Neuromuscular Disorders is a peer-reviewed medical journal that focuses on neuromuscular disease, including muscular dystrophy, spinal muscular atrophy, and myasthenia. It is the official journal of the World Muscle Society. It was established in 1991 and is published by Elsevier.

External links
 
 World Muscle Society

Elsevier academic journals
Monthly journals
English-language journals
Neurology journals
Publications established in 1991
Orthopedics journals